Ronald Stevenson (25 July 1873 – 12 February 1934) was a Scotland international rugby union player.

Rugby Union career

Amateur career

He started by playing for Northumberland.

Stevenson played rugby union for London Scottish.

Provincial career

He played for the Anglo-Scots on 24 December 1898 in their match against South of Scotland District. He scored a try in the match, which the Anglo-Scots won by 5 points to 4 points.

He was unable to travel to the Cities District versus Provinces District match on 14 January 1899 but his form meant selection for the international side was still considered.

International career

Stevenson was capped 6 times by Scotland from 1897 to 1899.

References

1873 births
1934 deaths
Rugby union players from South Shields
Scottish rugby union players
Scotland international rugby union players
London Scottish F.C. players
Scottish Exiles (rugby union) players
Rugby union forwards